The list of ship commissionings in 1921 includes a chronological list of all ships commissioned in 1921.


See also 

1921